Potez 25 (also written as Potez XXV) was a French twin-seat, single-engine sesquiplane designed during the 1920s. A multi-purpose fighter-bomber, it was designed as a line aircraft and used in a variety of roles, including fighter and escort missions, tactical bombing and reconnaissance missions. In the late 1920s and early 1930s, Potez 25 was the standard multi-purpose aircraft of over 20 air forces, including French and Polish. It was also popular among private operators, notably mail transport companies.

The aircraft was further developed into the 25M, a standard parasol-wing monoplane, which never entered production.

Design and development
In 1923, the Avions Henry Potez aircraft works started production of a successful Potez 15 reconnaissance biplane. Basing on experience gathered during the construction of that aircraft, Henry Potez started working on a new design of a heavier and faster multi-purpose aircraft. Designated Potez XXV or Potez 25, the prototype was built already in 1924. The main differences included a larger, more powerful engine and a new wing design. Instead of a classic biplane, Potez introduced a sesquiplane, with the lower wing significantly smaller. It was built in two main military variants: Potez 25A2 reconnaissance aircraft and Potez 25B2 bomber-reconnaissance aircraft.

In May 1925, the prototype was tested at the Service Technique d'Aeronautique Institute and was found a promising construction both for its manoeuvrability, speed and durability. Following the tests, the prototype entered serial production. To promote the new aircraft abroad, in a post-World War I market filled with hundreds of cheap demobilized aircraft, the Potez 25 was entered into a large number of races. Among the best-known achievements was a European rally (7,400 km/4,598 mi) and a Mediterranean rally (6,500 km/4,039 mi), both won by pilots flying the Potez. In 1920s, the Potez 25 was also used in a well-advertised Paris-Tehran rally (13,080 km/8,127 mi). In June 1930, Henri Guillaumet crashed with his Potez 25 in the Andes during an air mail flight. He survived after trekking through the mountains and was found after one week of searching.

Such achievements added to aircraft's popularity and made it one of the most successful French aircraft of the epoch. It was bought by a number of air forces, including those of France, Switzerland, Belgium, Brazil, Croatia, Estonia, Ethiopia, Finland, Greece, Spain, Japan, Yugoslavia, Paraguay, Poland, Portugal, Romania, Turkey and the USSR. After the USSR acquired two aircraft for testing, they decided against further purchases, finding it comparable to the native Polikarpov R-5. Altogether, approximately 2,500 aircraft were built in France.

Already in 1925, Poland bought a licence for Potez 25 and started to manufacture them in Podlaska Wytwórnia Samolotów (PWS, 150 built) and Plage i Laśkiewicz aircraft works (150 built). In 1928 the first Polish-built Potez 25 were tested by the Technical Aviation Development Institute in Warsaw and the design was slightly modified to better fit the needs of the Polish air forces. Among the notable differences were the introduction of leading edge slots. The production in Poland ceased in 1932. Altogether, 300 aircraft were built in a number of versions for long- and short-range reconnaissance and daylight tactical bombing. As the original Lorraine-Dietrich 12Eb engine was unavailable in Poland, it was replaced in 47 aircraft with a more powerful PZL Bristol Jupiter VIIF radial engine, starting from 1936.

In Romania, Potez 25 was produced by IAR. Several other countries manufactured Potez 25s under licence.

Variants

Potez 25One prototype aircraft, powered by a  Hispano-Suiza 12Ga W-12 engine. 

Potez 25 A.2
Two-seat observation version, powered by a  Salmson 18Cmb or Lorraine 12Eb engine.
Potez 25.5
Production version, powered by a  Renault 12Jb, 100 built.
Potez 25.8
A reconnaissance-bomber powered by a single  Farman 12Wc W-12 engine, several dozen of which were built.
Potez 25.12
Reconnaissance aircraft, approximately 280 built, powered by  Salmson 18Cmb 18 cyl. 9-bank in-line radial engines, (9 pairs of cylinders one behind the other, not staggered).
Potez 25.23
A single P-25.12, (n°71), modified for a tour of europe from 14 to 22 September 1928.
Potez 25.35
Two-seat target-tug version. 
Potez 25.36
Two-seat monoplane version
Potez 25.44
A reconnaissance-bomber powered by a single  Renault 12Jb V-12 engine, 74 of which were built.
Potez 25.47
A single liaison two-seater built especially for the Ministère de l'Air powered by a  Hispano-Suiza 12Lb V-12 engine.
Potez 25.55
Two-seat training version. 40 built.
Potez 25 ET.2
Two-seat intermediate training version, powered by a  Salmson 18Ab radial engine.
Potez 25 Farman 
Two-seat observation version for the French Air Force, powered by a  Farman 12We. Also known as the Potez 25/4. 12 built.
Potez 25GR
Long-range version, powered by  Lorraine 12Eb W-12 engines.
Potez 25 'Jupiter'
Export version, powered by a  Gnome-Rhône 9Ac Jupiter radial. Built under licence by Ikarbus in Yugoslavia and OSGA in Portugal, exported to Estonia and Switzerland.
Potez 25H
Two floatplane prototypes, each one was powered by Gnome-Rhône 9A Jupiter radials.
Potez 25 Hispano-Suiza
VIP transport version, powered by a  Hispano-Suiza 12Lb. 
Potez 25M
one Hispano-Suiza powered aircraft was converted into a parasol-wing monoplane.

Potez 25-O
Specially strengthened and modified version, built for a non-stop North-Atlantic crossing. The aircraft was powered by a Jupiter radial, fitted with jettisonable landing gear and a strengthened landing skid. Only two were built.
Potez 25TOE
Major production version, 795 built, powered by  Lorraine 12Eb W-12 engines.

Potez 25 engine test bed
 A single Potez 25 was used to test a Clerget 14F-01 14-cylinder, two-row radial diesel engine. This aircraft, complete with diesel engine was probably the aircraft exported to Japan which became the Potez CXP1 of the Imperial Japanese Navy Air Service (IJNAS).

Operators

Civil operators

Aéropostale
Caudron Flying School
Compagnie Francaise d'Aviation
Hanriot Airline and Hanriot Flying School

Military operators

Afghan Air Force

Belgian Air Force

Brazilian Air Force

Chinese Nationalist Air Force
Fengtian (Manchuria)
Sichuan clique

Zrakoplovstvo Nezavisne Države Hrvatske captured 42 from the Royal Yugoslav Air Force.

Ethiopian Air Force acquired 3 aircraft.

Estonian Air Force operated Potez 25 Jupiter up to 1940.

Finnish Air Force purchased one Potez 25 A.2 in 1927 and evaluated until 1936.

French Air Force
French Naval Aviation

Free French Air Force

Hellenic Air Force

Guatemalan Air Force

Imperial Japanese Army Air Service
Imperial Japanese Navy Air Service – Purchased as Potez CXP.

Paraguayan Air Force operated a total of 14 aircraft, six Potez 25 A.2 and eight Potez 25 TOE during the Chaco War against Bolivia.

Polish Air Force operated 16 aircraft bought in France and another 300 aircraft manufactured in Poland.

Portuguese Air Force

Royal Romanian Air Force

Spanish Republican Air Force

Swiss Air Force

Soviet Air Force – Two aircraft used for tests and trials.

Turkish Air Force

Uruguayan Air Force

Yugoslav Royal Air Force operated 200 aircraft manufactured in Yugoslavia.

Specifications (Potez 25)

See also
Aerial operations in the Chaco War

References

Citations

Bibliography

 Gerdessen, Frederik. "Estonian Air Power 1918 – 1945". Air Enthusiast, No. 18, April – July 1982. pp. 61–76. .

External links

1920s French military reconnaissance aircraft
1920s French bomber aircraft
025
Sesquiplanes
Single-engined tractor aircraft
Aircraft first flown in 1924